Major General Harry Leonard Nowell Salmon MC & Bar (February 9, 1894 – April 29, 1943) was a senior Canadian Army officer who fought in both World War I and World War II.

Early life and military career
Harry Salmon was born in Winnipeg, Manitoba, Canada, on February 9, 1894, son of John and Louise Salmon, one of three boys and three girls. After attending St. John's College in Winnipeg, he took a position in the  employ of the Cockshutt Plow Company as a clerk. While civilian administrative life wasn't to be his for long, his brief experience would serve him well in later years.

Enlisting in the Canadian Army at the age of twenty, his military career began in 1914 with the 95th Saskatchewan Rifles out of Regina, though he was soon assigned to the 28th Battalion, another western Canadian unit. He served with distinction in the First World War, spending from 1915 to 1919 in Europe. During this era of trench warfare, he was involved as the first tanks lumbered across no-man's land marking the emergence of mechanized fighting forces.

While with the 28th Battalion, Salmon was caught up in the bloody deadlocked period of the war in northern France around the Somme and Ypres. His participation was anything but ordinary and he was to be decorated twice for gallantry, receiving the Military Cross and Bar.

His first commendation was in October 1916, recognizing his contribution in a brutal battle of September 1915 in Courcelette, where he had rallied his men after the platoon's officer was killed. He was thereafter hospitalized and out of commission for months with a shrapnel wound that pierced his chest and lung.

On November 6, 1917, in what has been called the third battle of Ypres, the 28th was tasked with an objective that would help break the multi-year deadlock around Passchendaele. During this operation, 'D' company was charged with penetrating through the attack to seize the objective, and overcome enemy lines. Heavy losses were suffered, including the commander of 'D' company, whereupon Lieutenant Salmon MC assumed command and pushed forward to achieve the objective. The stalemate that had cost over a quarter of a million Allied lives ended with the offensive that day. The war diary for the battalion reads simply – D company with two platoons under Lieut. Salmon holding the line.

Between the wars, from 1920 to 1929, he performed regimental duty with The Royal Canadian Regiment and served in staff appointments. During this period he also attended the Staff College, Camberley, in England, from 1930−1931.

Second World War
He joined the staff of the 1st Canadian Infantry Division in January 1940, attaining rank of Lt. Col. in February of that year, and commanding the Hastings and Prince Edward Regiment (colloquially known as the "Hasty P's"). Following the disaster at Dunkirk which culminated on June 4, Lt. Col. Salmon led the Hasty P's in a June 16 operation to Brest, France to assist in the withdrawal of the Canadian elements of the second British Expeditionary Force (BEF). The next day, as word was received that Paris had fallen, and just a week before the Armistice of 22 June 1940, Salmon's regiment began a brief expedition to engage the rapidly moving invasion that was sweeping into France.  Events moved unpredictably fast and the unit was soon ordered to return to England along with the British Expeditionary Force. While aboard ship awaiting departure to Plymouth, the regiment engaged with harassing German aircraft. They were later credited with being the first Canadian soldiers to bring down a German aircraft during the war, as the eager troops fired their first shots at a low flying plane that attempted an opportunistic attack of the harbour.

On September 8, 1942 when Lieutenant-General Andrew McNaughton, the commander of the First Canadian Army, chose Salmon to take over command of 1st Canadian Division (he was at the time leading the 7th Canadian Infantry Brigade of the 3rd Canadian Infantry Division). Accounts at the time recorded his reputation as "one of the best trainers of soldiers in any army". In their first overseas deployment since the First World War, the role for the 1st Cdn Div in England was to develop and execute exercises in preparation to repel a possible Nazi invasion of the south coast of England near Eastbourne.

In 1943 Salmon was appointed to head the Canadian involvement in Operation Husky, the allied invasion of Sicily which would be part of the push that brought about the end of the war. A planning staff was built around Salmon in Norfolk House, where some of the highest members of the Allied staff were situated. On April 29, 1943, Salmon, along with other important participants prepared to embark for a meeting in Cairo, Egypt. The aircraft was scheduled to embark from Hendon Airfield in north London, landing in Portreath and from there making the way around occupied Europe to attend the meeting. Weather was bad in Portreath and this was communicated to No. 10 Squadron RAF at Hendon. It was decided to instead go to RAF Chivenor where the weather was also poor but manageable. The Hudson IIIA aircraft embarked and was seen approaching for a landing on the East–West runway at Chivenor, when the aircraft stalled and crashed, killing all on board. Major-General Guy Simonds took over command of the 1st Canadian Division and led the Canadian forces in operation Husky. Simonds had briefly held the command of 2nd Canadian Division and was transferred to the 1st Division after Salmon's death.

Family History
The "Nowell" in Salmon's name is an acknowledgement of an ancestor prominent in British military service. His grandfather's brother Nowell Salmon served with the Royal Navy, rising to the rank of Admiral of the Fleet. He received the Victoria Cross for his gallantry during the relief of Lucknow during the Indian Rebellion in November 1857. Nowell Salmon's maternal grandfather (H.L.N. Salmon's great-great-grandfather) was Admiral Nowell who had served the Royal Navy at the Battle of the Saintes and in the American Revolutionary War.

References

External links
National Archives of Canada in Ottawa, Ontario, Canada
The National Archives (England) in London, UK
The Times, 15 February 1912 Obituaries: Sir Nowell Salmon.
Canada genealogy of Field Marshal, Admiral of the Fleet & Marshal of the R.A.F.
Generals of World War II

1894 births
1943 deaths
Canadian Army generals of World War II
People from Winnipeg
Victims of aviation accidents or incidents in the United Kingdom
Accidental deaths in England
Canadian military personnel killed in World War II
Canadian Expeditionary Force officers
Canadian military personnel of World War I
Graduates of the Staff College, Camberley
Canadian generals
Canadian military personnel from Manitoba
Royal Canadian Regiment officers
Canadian recipients of the Military Cross